Win Maw Oo (19 November 1971 – 19 September 1988) was a Burmese student activist who was killed during the 8888 Uprising in Burma (Myanmar). She is considered one of the most prominent heroes of Burma's pro-democracy movement.

Early life and education
Win Maw Oo, the eldest of six siblings, was born on 19 September 1971 in Kyimyindaing Township, Yangon. She went to Basic Education High School (4), Kyimyindaing.

Death
Against her parents' wishes, she marched with her fellow classmates on 19 September 1988, carrying a picture of Independent hero Bogyoke Aung San. She was shot by soldiers as part of the Myanmar military's crackdown on the protests, receiving two bullets in her legs and one in her chest.

Legacy

An image of Win Maw Oo's bloodied body being carried by two medical students became an emblem for the opposition against Myanmar's brutal military regime. Her sacrifice became an icon of the "88 movement".

Win Maw Oo's last request was to not perform her last funeral rites until Burma enjoys democracy. 28 years later, in May 2016, one month after the democratically elected government led by Aung San Suu Kyi came to power, her family held the last Buddhist funerary rites of Win Maw Oo. The event was widely publicized.

She is the subject of a film by U Anthony which depicts her real-life events surrounding the death.

References

1971 births
1988 deaths
Burmese democracy activists
People from Yangon Region
Protest-related deaths
Deaths by firearm in Myanmar